On 29 July 2022, during the Russian invasion of Ukraine, a building housing Ukrainian prisoners of war in a Russian-operated prison in Molodizhne near Olenivka, Donetsk Oblast, was destroyed, killing 53 Ukrainian prisoners of war (POWs) and leaving 75 wounded. The prisoners were mainly soldiers from the Azovstal complex, the last Ukrainian stronghold in the siege of Mariupol.

The General Staff of the Ukrainian Armed Forces said that the Russians blew up the barracks in order to cover up the torture and murder of Ukrainian POWs that had been taking place there, and Ukrainian authorities provided what they said were satellite images of pre-dug graves and intercepted communications indicating Russian culpability, while Russians suggested that a HIMARS rocket was shot from Ukrainian territory. According to a CNN investigation based on the work of forensic and weapons experts, the Russian version of events is very likely a fabrication, as there is virtually no chance that the damage was caused by a HIMARS rocket.

On 3 August, the UN secretary-general Antonio Guterres announced his decision to establish a fact-finding mission, as requested both by Russia and Ukraine. However, Russia refused to cooperate with UN and International Red Cross, and the fact-finding mission was disbanded.

Explosion 
On the night of 29 July, a single barracks in a prison in Molodizhne was damaged by an explosion, killing and wounding a number of prisoners kept inside. The prison is located near the village of Olenivka, a settlement southwest of Donetsk that is controlled by the Russian-backed Donetsk People's Republic (DPR). Russian and DPR casualty tallies suggest 53 Ukrainian POWs died, and another 75 were wounded (a Russian communiqué initially suggested 40 dead and 75 wounded, in addition to 8 guards). The Ukrainian side suggested that about 40 people were dead and 130 were wounded.

Both sides agree that there were captive Azov fighters in the destroyed barracks, brought there a few days before the event. Denis Pushilin, the leader of DPR, suggested that among the 193 inmates at the detention facility, there were no foreigners, but did not specify the number of Ukrainians held captive. Russian officials released a list of deceased POWs. , Ukrainian officials stated that they are unable to verify the list.

On the day the prisoners were killed, the Russian embassy in London posted a tweet stating that the Azov Regiment fighters "deserve execution, but death not by firing squad but by hanging, because they're not real soldiers. They deserve a humiliating death", with a video of a couple from Mariupol saying they were victims of shelling. The sentence in the tweet was a quotation from the man in the video.

Four days after the explosion, the Russian supreme court declared the Azov Regiment a terrorist organization, and in response Ukrainian intelligence said that this was intended to justify a Russian war crime committed against Ukrainians including members of the unit of the National Guard of Ukraine.

Responsibility 
Russian authorities stated that the Ukrainian forces attacked the prison with Ukrainian prisoners of war using HIMARS rocket systems that had been provided by the United States. As Russian side released videos and photos from inside the barrack, a CNN analysis noted that the Russian version of events is very likely a fabrication as there is virtually no chance that the damage was caused by a HIMARS rocket. According to the analysis the most likely cause of the explosion was an incendiary device detonated from inside the prison warehouse. The Institute for the Study of War said that available visual evidence supports the Ukrainian version of the events as the character of explosions was not consistent with a HIMARS strike, but that it could not say with certainty which side is responsible.

InformNapalm, a Ukrainian volunteer initiative, assigned the blame to the Russians by suggesting that they used a RPO-A Shmel flamethrower or an MRO-A rocket and waited for the captives to burn alive. Prosecutor General of Ukraine Andrii Kostin stated that "according to preliminary data from international experts, prisoners in the occupied Olenivka penal colony were killed with thermobaric weapons. An Israeli-Ukrainian military officer suggested that Russia perpetrated the attack on Ukrainian war prisoners to make Russian soldiers fear torture and thus deter them from surrendering to Ukrainian forces advancing in the Kherson region.

The Security Service of Ukraine (SBU) released recordings of taped telephone conversations between Russian soldiers, which suggested that the Russians had planted an explosive inside the building. The SBU added that from available video evidence, some windows were left intact and that no eyewitness accounts mention any shelling or sounds that would have normally accompanied it, which also suggests that no rocket had struck the detention facility. According to Ukraine's Ministry of Defense Intelligence Directorate, the explosion was carried out by the Wagner Group, a Russian government-backed private military company accused of war crimes in Africa, Syria, and Ukraine, but without prior consultation with the Russian Defence Ministry.

Investigation 
Ukraine's Foreign Ministry appealed to the International Criminal Court regarding the attack, which it called a Russian war crime, and Russia said it was starting its own investigation. Russian and Ukrainian officials also called for the International Red Cross and the United Nations to intervene. Late in the evening of 30 July Russia declared it will allow the representatives of these organisations on the site. However, ICRC (International Committee of the Red Cross) declared it did not receive invitation, nor a response to their own request to visit the site. By October 2022 no international observers or humanitarian organizations were allowed into Olenivka or granted access to the survivors, and Russian side has never published a detailed list of killed and wounded, or notified their relatives, or ICRC who has officially registered them as prisoners of war during their surrender in Mariupol.

On 3 August, UN secretary-general Antonio Guterres announced his decision to established a fact-finding mission, as requested both by Russia and Ukraine. Guterres disbanded the fact-finding mission into the attack on 3 January 2023 (according to a UN spokesman) "as the UN mission cannot deploy to the site."

Reactions 
In a statement issued on 29 July, Josep Borrell, the top foreign relations official of the European Union, blamed Russia for the attack and called it a "horrific atrocity" and a "barbaric act". The officials in Estonia, the United Kingdom and France expressed a similar attitude.

The White House on 2 August 2022 mentioned that new intelligence information hints that Russia is working to fabricate evidence concerning the massacre. In August Russia invited a number of Russian media and actor Steven Seagal to the facility where they made statements supporting the official Russian version of HIMARS attack.

Further events 
On 11 October, the bodies of 62 soldiers, including prisoners of war killed in Olenivka, were returned to Ukraine.

See also 
 War crimes in the 2022 Russian invasion of Ukraine

References

External links 
 Удар по колонии с пленными украинскими военными в Еленовке: то немногое, что пока известно  (tr. "A strike on a colony with captured Ukrainian soldiers in Yelenovka: what little is known so far"), BBC.com
 

Explosions in 2022
July 2022 events in Ukraine
Airstrikes during the 2022 Russian invasion of Ukraine
Attacks on buildings and structures in Ukraine
War crimes during the 2022 Russian invasion of Ukraine
Mass murder in 2022
2020s building bombings
21st-century mass murder in Ukraine
Attacks on buildings and structures in 2022
History of Donetsk Oblast
Eastern Ukraine offensive
Disasters in prisons
Massacres in 2022
Massacres in Ukraine
False flag operations
Prisoner of war massacres